Qualification for the 2023 Little League World Series will take place in ten United States regions and ten international regions from February through August 2023.

United States

Great Lakes 
The tournament will take place in Whitestown, Indiana from August 5–9.

Metro 
The tournament will take place in Bristol, Connecticut from August 5–11.

Mid-Atlantic 
The tournament will take place in Bristol, Connecticut from August 6–11.

Midwest 
The tournament will take place in Whitestown, Indiana from August 4–11.

Mountain 
The tournament will take place in San Bernardino, California from August 6–11.

New England 
The tournament will take place in Bristol, Connecticut from August 5–10.

Northwest 
The tournament will take place in San Bernardino, California from August 5–10.

Southeast 
The tournament will take place in Warner Robins, Georgia from August 3–8.

Southwest 
The tournament will take place in Waco, Texas from August 3–8.

West 
The tournament will take place in San Bernardino, California from August 5–11.

International

Asia-Pacific 
The tournament will take place in Seoul, South Korea from June 29–July 4.

Australia 
The tournament took place in Gold Coast, Queensland from June 4–11.

Canada 
The tournament will take place in Regina, Saskatchewan from August 1–10.

Caribbean 
The tournament will take place in Yabucoa, Puerto Rico.

Cuba 
As part of a rotational schedule also involving Panama and Puerto Rico, the winner of the Cuba Region gained direct entry into the tournament in 2023. This was the first time a team from the nation of Cuba qualified for the LLWS. The tournament took place from February 11–March 4.

Europe and Africa 
The tournament will take place in Kutno, Poland from July 22–29.

Japan 
The tournament will take place in Tokyo.

Latin America 
The tournament will take place in Maracaibo, Venezuela.

Mexico 
The tournament will take place in Monterrey, Nuevo León.

Panama 
As part of a rotational schedule also involving Cuba and Puerto Rico, the winner of the Panama Region gained direct entry into the tournament in 2023. The tournament took place from February 11–26 in David, Aguadulce, and Juan Díaz.

Pool play - Zone 1

Pool play - Zone 2

Pool play - Zone 3

Elimination round

References

2023 Little League World Series
2023 in baseball